Julian Przyboś (5 March 1901 – 6 October 1970) was a Polish poet, essayist and translator, one of the most important poets of the Kraków Avant-Garde.

Life
Przyboś was born in Gwoźnica near Strzyżów to a peasant family. From 1912, he attended the Konarski Secondary School in Rzeszów.

A supporter of socialist ideals, in 1920 he volunteered for the Polish Army during the Polish–Soviet War. In 1920–1923 he studied Polish studies at the Jagiellonian University in Kraków. Przyboś worked as a teacher in Sokal (1923–1925), Chrzanów (1925–1927), and Cieszyn (1927–1939). In Cieszyn, he published his works in Zaranie Śląskie (Silesian Dawn) (1929–1938). He also published in many other magazines before and after World War II.

In December 1939 Przyboś relocated to Lviv. In 1941 was he arrested by the Gestapo, the Nazi German secret police. After World War II he became a member of the Polish Workers' Party, and later of the Polish United Workers' Party. In 1947–1951 he was a diplomat in Switzerland. Afterward he was director of the Jagiellonian Library in Kraków. After the Hungarian Revolution of 1956, Przyboś left the Polish United Workers' Party.

Works
 Śruby (1925)
 Oburącz (1926)
 Z ponad (also known as Sponad) (1930)
 W głąb las (1932)
 Równanie serca (1938)
 Póki my żyjemy (1944)
 Miejsce na ziemi (1945)
 Czytając Mickiewicza (1950)
 Rzut pionowy (1952) - poetry collection
 Najmniej słów. Poezje. Materiały poetyckie. Objaśnienia (1955)
 Linia i gwar, vol. 1-2 (1956)
 Narzędzie ze światła (1958)
 Więcej o manifest (1962)
 Sens poetycki (1963)
 Na znak (1965)
 Kwiat nieznany (1968)

See also
List of Poles

References

Further reading 
 

1901 births
1970 deaths
People from Strzyżów County
People from the Kingdom of Galicia and Lodomeria
Polish Workers' Party politicians
Polish United Workers' Party members
Members of the State National Council
Diplomats of the Polish People's Republic
Polish essayists
Polish male writers
Male essayists
Polish translators
20th-century translators
20th-century Polish poets
20th-century essayists
Jagiellonian University alumni
Polish people of the Polish–Soviet War
Officers of the Order of Polonia Restituta
Recipients of the Order of the Banner of Work
Recipients of the Gold Cross of Merit (Poland)
Recipients of the State Award Badge (Poland)
Recipient of the Meritorious Activist of Culture badge